Rivalta di Torino is a comune (municipality) in the Metropolitan City of Turin in the Italian region Piedmont, located about 14 km southwest of Turin in the valley of the Sangone.

It is home to a medieval castle, around which the town originated starting from the 11th century. The castle and the village were owned by the Orsini local branch until 1823. The castle has a massive appearance and was once accessed through a drawbridge, now replaced by a stone one. In 1836 French writer Honoré de Balzac was guest of the local lord, count Cesare Benevello, as testified by an inscription in the castle's court.

References

External links
 Official website

Cities and towns in Piedmont